The 2022 Raiders Tirol season is the inaugural season of the newly formed Raiders Tirol team in the second season of the European League of Football.

Preseason
The Raiders Tirol joined the ELF via a press release on September 25, 2021, after winning multiple times their national league AFL. On the November 14, 2021 the Raiders confirmed Kevin Herron as their headcoach for the 2022 ELF season and later confirmed in an interview, that their official name of the team will be Raiders Tirol in dropping the name sponsorship.

Regular season

Standings

Schedule
 
Source: europeanleague.football

Roster

Transactions
From Cologne Centurions: Dartez Jacobs (January 10, 2022)

Staff

Notes

References

Raiders Tirol
Raiders Tirol
Raiders Tirol